Richard Stanford may refer to:

 Richard Stanford (Kent cricketer) (1754–1792), English cricketer
 Richard Stanford (Sussex cricketer), English cricketer
 Richard Stanford (American politician) (1767–1816), U.S. Representative from North Carolina
 Richard Stanford (MP), Member of Parliament (MP) for Stafford 1382–1402 and relative of Hugh de Stanford
 Richard Stanford (rugby union) (born 1986), rugby union footballer
 Richard Stanford (British Army officer), British general